Sugano (written: 菅野) is a Japanese surname. Notable people with the surname include:

, Japanese footballer
, Japanese noble
, Japanese astronomer
, Japanese aikidoka
, Japanese footballer
, Japanese baseball player
, Japanese footballer

See also
Sugano Station, a railway station in Ichikawa, Chiba Prefecture, Japan
Sugano Dam, a dam in Shūnan, Yamaguchi Prefecture, Japan
5872 Sugano, a main-belt asteroid

Japanese-language surnames